Peter A de Giles (8 April 1927 – 10 April 2015) was a British rower.

Rowing career
He competed in the men's coxed four event at the 1952 Summer Olympics.

He represented England and won a bronze medal in the eights at the 1950 British Empire Games in Auckland, New Zealand.

Personal life
During the Games in 1950 he lived at Roslyn, Galton Park Road, Redhill, Surrey and was a farm student by trade.

References

1927 births
2015 deaths
British male rowers
Olympic rowers of Great Britain
Rowers at the 1952 Summer Olympics
Place of birth missing
Commonwealth Games medallists in rowing
Commonwealth Games bronze medallists for England
Rowers at the 1950 British Empire Games
Medallists at the 1950 British Empire Games